The 2013–14 Saint Louis Billikens men's basketball team represented Saint Louis University in the 2013–14 NCAA Division I men's basketball season. The Billikens were led by their head coach Jim Crews who was in his first full year season at Saint Louis. The team played their home games at Chaifetz Arena. They were a member of the Atlantic 10 Conference. They finished the season 27–7, 13–3 in A-10 play to win the regular season conference championship. They lost in the quarterfinals of the A-10 tournament to St. Bonaventure. They received an at-large bid to the NCAA tournament where they defeated NC State in the second round before losing in the third round to Louisville.

Roster

Schedule

|-
!colspan=9 style="background:#0000CC; color:#FFFFFF;"| Exhibition

|-
!colspan=9 style="background:#0000CC; color:#FFFFFF;"| Regular season

|-
!colspan=9 style="background:#0000CC; color:#FFFFFF;"| Atlantic 10 tournament

|-
!colspan=9 style="background:#0000CC; color:#FFFFFF;"| NCAA tournament

Rankings

Preseason

Departures

References

Saint Louis
Saint Louis Billikens men's basketball seasons
Saint Louis
Saint
Saint